Numerophobia, arithmophobia or mathematics anxiety is an anxiety disorder, where the condition is fear of dealing with numbers  or mathematics. Sometimes numerophobia refers to fear of particular numbers.

Fears of specific numbers 
Tetraphobia – fear of 4
Triskaidekaphobia – fear of 13
Heptadecaphobia - fear of 17
23 enigma – fear of 23
Curse of 39 - fear of 39
Hexakosioihexekontahexaphobia - fear of 666

Number related superstitions in music 

 Curse of the ninth
 27 Club

References 

Phobias
Superstitions about numbers